Kaykhosrow Khan (died 1674) was a Safavid military commander and gholam of Georgian descent. He served as the commander of the musketeer corps (tofangchi-aghasi) from 1670 to 1674, during the reign of king Suleiman I (r. 1666–1694).

Kaykhosrow's mother was a daughter of Bijan Beg, of the Georgian Saakadze family, and, thus, a nephew to Bijan's sons Rostam (the sepahsalar, d. 1643), Aliqoli (d. 1667), and Isa (d. 1654). Kaykhosrow's son, Manuchehr, briefly served as the governor of Darun in 1698–1699.

Sources
 
 

1674 deaths
Safavid generals
Iranian people of Georgian descent
Nobility of Georgia (country)
Shia Muslims from Georgia (country)
Tofangchi-aghasi
Safavid ghilman
17th-century people of Safavid Iran